The National Unity Movement ( - MUN) is a Nicaraguan political party founded in 2000 by retired army chief and Sandinista dissident Joaquín Cuadra. In the 2004 Municipal Elections, the MUN contested in alliance with Alliance for the Republic (APRE). As of 2006, the MUN is part of the Sandinista Renovation Movement (MRS) electoral alliance.

Sources
Revista Envío
 La Prensa 
 El Nuevo Diario

Political parties established in 2000
Political parties in Nicaragua